Sonia Savitri Anand  (born 1968) is a Canadian vascular medicine specialist. She previously held  the Eli Lilly Canada- May Cohen Chair in Women's Health and currently holds the Michael DeGroote Heart and Stroke Chair in Population Health and Epidemiology at McMaster University.

Early life and education
Anand was born in 1968 to Indian immigrant parents in Kentville, Nova Scotia, Canada. Her parents were both physicians; her mother Saroj D. Ram (now deceased) was an anesthesiologist, and her father S.V. (Andy) Anand (passed away on October 3, 2022) was a general surgeon. Her father was from Tamil Nadu and her mother was from Punjab. She has two older sisters, Gita Anand who is an employment lawyer in Toronto, and Anita, who is a lawyer and politician. Anand received her medical degree from McMaster University in 1992 and completed her training and fellowship in internal medicine at the same institution.

Career
Following her fellowship, Anand joined the faculty at McMaster University in 1996. Shortly thereafter, she was promoted to the rank of associate professor in the McMaster University Medical School and named the Eli Lilly Canada - May Cohen Chair in Women's Health. While serving in these roles, she also directed the vascular medicine clinic at Hamilton Health Sciences. As a result of her research, Anand established the Gender Research and Cardiovascular Evaluation Network (GRACE) Network. The aim of the GRACE network was to perform gender-based research in cardiovascular disease, train new researchers, and ensure transparency and accessibility. In 2011, Anand was the recipient of a Tier 1 Canada Research Chair in Ethnic Diversity and Cardiovascular Disease to fund her research on high risk populations such as South Asians and Indigenous peoples in Canada. 

As a Canada Research Chair, Anand was also appointed director of the Chanchlani Research Centre which aimed to "understand the causes and consequences of common diseases that afflict ethnic populations, women and the socially disadvantaged." Anand was re-appointed as a Tier 1 Canada Research Chair in 2017. Following her re-appointment, Anand was also named the inaugural Associate Chair, Equity, and Diversity for McMaster's Department of Medicine. In 2019, Anand was elected a Fellow of the Canadian Academy of Health Sciences. In 2022, Anand was named a Fellow in the Royal Society of Canada's Academy of Science (FRSC). Fellowship in the RSC represents the highest academic honour in Canada. 

During the COVID-19 pandemic, Anand became the principal investigator of the COVID CommUNITY-South Asian and COVID CommUNITY-First Nations study which collected, analyzed, and reported data relating to COVID-19 vaccine effectiveness and safety. She was also the recipient of the 2020 Lifetime Achievement Award from the South Asian Health Foundation.

Personal life
Anand and her husband, a family physician, have three children together.

References

External links

1968 births
Living people
Academic staff of McMaster University
Canadian cardiologists
Women cardiologists
People from Kentville, Nova Scotia
Canada Research Chairs
Fellows of the Canadian Academy of Health Sciences